Al-Sultan Hali Kalaminjaa II Sri Areedhi Suvara Mahaa Radun (Dhivehi: އައްސުލްޠާން ހަލީ ކަލަމިންޖާ ދެވަނަ ސިރީ އަރީދީ ސުވަރަ މަހާރަދުން) or Al-Sultan Ali III Sri Areedha Suvara Mahaa Radun (Dhivehi: އައްސުލްޠާން ޢަލީ ކަލަމިންޖާ ތިންވަނަ ސިރީ އަރީދީ ސުވަރަ މަހާރަދުން) was the Sultan of Maldives from 1278 to 1288. He succeeded his father Audha on the throne. He had no offspring and was succeeded by his brother Yoosuf.

13th-century sultans of the Maldives
Hali II, Sultan
Year of birth unknown